Christopher Wyatt Woods (born July 19, 1962) is a former American football wide receiver who played three seasons in the National Football League (NFL) with the Los Angeles Raiders and Denver Broncos. He was drafted by the Raiders in with the 28th overall pick in the 1984 NFL supplemental draft of USFL and CFL players. He played college football at Auburn University and attended A. H. Parker High School in Birmingham, Alabama. Woods was also a member of the Edmonton Eskimos and Toronto Argonauts of the Canadian Football League (CFL).

Woods was a candidate for mayor of his hometown of Birmingham, Alabama in the 2017 election; he finished third with 18% of the vote behind Randall Woodfin and incumbent William A. Bell (Woodfin beat Bell in the run-off).

References

External links
Just Sports Stats
College stats

Living people
1962 births
Players of American football from Birmingham, Alabama
Players of Canadian football from Birmingham, Alabama
American football wide receivers
Canadian football wide receivers
African-American players of American football
African-American players of Canadian football
Auburn Tigers football players
Edmonton Elks players
Toronto Argonauts players
Los Angeles Raiders players
Denver Broncos players
21st-century African-American politicians
21st-century American politicians
20th-century African-American sportspeople
Candidates in the 2021 United States elections